Typophorini is a tribe of leaf beetles in the subfamily Eumolpinae. The tribe contains approximately 100 genera, which are found worldwide. Members of the tribe are mainly characterized by notches on the tibiae of the middle and hind legs, which are sometimes referred to as antenna cleaners. They also generally have a subglabrous body, as well as bifid pretarsal claws.

Taxonomy
Following the leaf beetle classification of Seeno and Wilcox (1982), the genera of Typophorini are largely divided into five informal groups or "sections": Callisinites, Metachromites, Nodostomini, Pagriites and Typophorites, with some genera having incertae sedis placement within the tribe.

In the Catalog of the leaf beetles of America North of Mexico, published in 2003, the section Scelodontites of Bromiini was transferred to Typophorini.

Genera
These 76 genera belong to the tribe Typophorini:

 Afroeurydemus Selman, 1965
 Amblynetes Weise, 1904
 Aphilenia Weise in Reitter, 1889
 Atomyria Jacobson, 1894
 Basilepta Baly, 1860
 Bedelia Lefèvre, 1875
 Callisina Baly, 1860
 Cheiridea Baly, 1878
 Chloropterus Morawitz, 1861
 Chrysonopa Jacoby, 1908
 Chrysopida Baly, 1861
 Cleoparida Gressitt, 1967
 Cleoporus Lefèvre, 1884
 Cleorina Lefèvre, 1885
 Clypeolaria Lefèvre, 1885
 Coniomma Weise, 1922
 Deretrichia Weise, 1913
 Edistus Lefèvre, 1884
 Entreriosa Bechyné, 1953
 Epinodostoma Bryant & Gressitt, 1957
 Eurydemus Chapuis, 1874
 Gaberella Selman, 1965
 Graphops LeConte, 1859 (formerly in Adoxini)
 Gressittana Medvedev, 2009
 Gressittella Medvedev, 2009
 Iviva Gressitt, 1969
 Jansonius Baly, 1878
 Keeta Maulik, 1931
 Labasa Bryant, 1925
 Lindinia Lefèvre, 1893
 Mandollia Selman, 1965
 Medvedemolpus Moseyko, 2010
 Meniellus Weise, 1903
 Menius Chapuis, 1874
 Metachroma Chevrolat in Dejean, 1836
 Microeurydemus Pic, 1938
 Micromolpus Gressitt, 1969
 Microsyagrus Pic, 1952
 Mireditha Reitter, 1913
 Mouhotina Lefèvre, 1885
 Nakanaia Gressitt, 1969
 Nodina Motschulsky, 1858
 Nodostella Jacoby, 1908
 Pagellia Lefèvre, 1885
 Pagria Lefèvre, 1884
 Paraivongius Pic, 1936
 Parascela Baly, 1878
 Paria LeConte, 1858
 Periparia Bechyné, 1951
 Phaedroides Lefèvre, 1885
 Phainodina Gressitt, 1969
 Phytoparia Bechyné, 1957
 Phytorellus Medvedev & Moseyko, 2003
 Phytorus Jacoby, 1884
 Proliniscus Selman, 1965
 Pseudivongius Jacoby, 1897
 Pseudolpus Jacoby, 1884
 Pseudostonopa Jacoby, 1903
 Rhembastus Harold, 1877
 Rhynchomolpus Gressitt, 1969
 Rhyparida Baly, 1861
 Rhyparidella Gressitt, 1969
 Sarum Selman, 1965
 Sedlacekia Gressitt, 1969
 Selmania Zoia, 2019 (= Massartia Selman, 1965)
 Stethotes Baly, 1867
 Stizomolpus Gressitt, 1969
 Stygnobia Weise, 1922
 Syagrus Chapuis, 1874
 Thyrasia Jacoby, 1884
 Tijucana Bechyné, 1957
 Tricliona Lefèvre, 1885
 Tricliophora Jacoby, 1904
 Typophorus Chevrolat in Dejean, 1836
 Vitibia Fairmaire, 1882
 Zohrana Aslam, 1968

Gallery

References

Further reading

External links

 

Beetle tribes
Eumolpinae